The following article is a list of footballers past and present who have played for Bristol Rovers Football Club.

In the club's early history the appearance record was held by goalkeeper Arthur Cartlidge, who played in 258 Southern League games between 1901 and 1909. His record stood until it was broken by another goalkeeper, Jesse Whatley, who played 14 times in the Southern League and a further 372 in The Football League, making a total of 386 overall. Following the Second World War the Bristol Rovers board introduced a no-buy/no-sell policy, which remained in force until the abolition of the maximum wage in football in 1961; as a result some players in that era had a high number of appearances for the club. Eight of the top nine most-used players played during this time, each making over 400 appearances. These eight were Bobby Jones (421 appearances), Alfie Biggs (424), Ray Warren (450), Harold Jarman (452), George Petherbridge (457), Geoff Bradford (462), Jack Pitt (466), and Harry Bamford (486). The club's all-time leading appearance maker, Stuart Taylor, played in 546 League games between 1965 and 1980. The club's highest scorer by a wide margin is Geoff Bradford, who scored 242 times in The Football League, exceeding the next-highest scorer Alfie Biggs by 64 goals.

Players

The list of players below includes all team members who have played in at least 100 professional league games for Bristol Rovers, which includes games played in the Southern League (1899–1920), Football League (1920–2014 and 2015–) and Football Conference (2014–15), and also includes substitute appearances.

Position key:
GK – Goalkeeper; 
DF – Defender;
MF – Midfielder;
FW – Forward

Footnotes
 Unless otherwise stated, all international caps are taken from Byrne & Jay (2003).
 A player's nationality is defined as the country they have represented at the international level if they have done so; otherwise it is their country of birth.
 Playing positions are taken from Byrne & Jay (2003) unless otherwise stated.
 Number of league appearances for Bristol Rovers
 Number of league goals scored for Bristol Rovers
 Unless otherwise stated, player statistics are taken from Byrne & Jay (2003).
 Matt O'Mahoney was a dual Irish international, having played for both the FAI and IFA national teams.

See also
 List of Bristol Rovers F.C. international players
 List of Bristol Rovers F.C. players (25–99 appearances)
 :Category:Bristol Rovers F.C. players
 Bristol Rovers F.C.#Current squad

References

Bibliography

Bristol Rovers F.C. players
Bristol Rovers
Bristol Rovers players
Association football player non-biographical articles